Enhet  may refer to:

Unity (Sweden), a political party in Sweden
Enhet, Belgium, a place in Belgium